Baltimore is the most populous city in the state of Maryland, in the United States.

Baltimore may also refer to:

Places

Canada
 Baltimore, Ontario, Township of Hamilton, Ontario

Ireland
 Baltimore, County Cork
 Baltimore (Parliament of Ireland constituency)
 Baltimore, County Longford, former manor around Drumlish

United States
 Baltimore Township, Henry County, Iowa
 Baltimore, Indiana, a ghost town of the 19th century
 Baltimore, Ohio, a suburb of Columbus
 Baltimore, Tennessee
 Baltimore, Vermont
 Baltimore County, Maryland
 Baltimore Hundred, an unincorporated subdivision of Sussex County, Delaware
 Baltimore Town, California, a former settlement
 Baltimore Township, Michigan
 Knights Landing, California, formerly called Baltimore

Russia
 Voronezh Malshevo (air base), also known as Baltimore air base

People
 Baron Baltimore, a title (1625–1771) in the Peerage of Ireland
 George Calvert, 1st Baron Baltimore (1579–1632), English politician and colonizer
 Cecilius Calvert, 2nd Baron Baltimore (1605–1675), English peer
 Charles Calvert, 3rd Baron Baltimore (1637–1715)
 Benedict Calvert, 4th Baron Baltimore (1679–1715), English nobleman and politician
 Charles Calvert, 5th Baron Baltimore (1699–1751), British nobleman
 Frederick Calvert, 6th Baron Baltimore (1731–1771), English nobleman and last in the line of Barons Baltimore
 David Baltimore (born 1938), American biologist and 1975 Nobel Prize laureate
 Charli Baltimore (born 1974), American rapper/hip-hop artist
 Sandy Baltimore (born 2000), French professional footballer

Arts, entertainment, and media

Music
 Baltimore (album), by Nina Simone (1978)
 Baltimore club, a genre of house and dance music

Songs

 "Baltimore" (Tori Amos song)
 "Baltimore", a song by Randy Newman, from his album Little Criminals, covered by Nina Simone and others
 "Baltimore", a song by Prince, from his album Hit n Run Phase Two
 "Baltimore", a song by The Extra Glenns from Martial Arts Weekend
 "Baltimore", a song by Stephen Malkmus on Real Emotional Trash

Other media
 Baltimore (novel and comic series), by Mike Mignola and Christopher Golden
 Baltimore, or The Steadfast Tin Soldier and the Vampire, a 2007 illustrated novel
 Baltimore (magazine), a monthly city magazine
 "Baltimore" (NCIS), a television episode

Sports
 Baltimore Bullets, National Basketball Association team formerly named Washington Wizards
 Baltimore Orioles, Major League Baseball team based in Baltimore, Maryland
 Baltimore Ravens, American football team based in Baltimore, Maryland
 Baltimore Stallions, former Canadian Football team based in Baltimore, Maryland

Transportation
 Baltimore Clipper, a type of fast sailing vessel built in the late 18th and early 19th century
 Baltimore (tug), a steam-powered tugboat
 Baltimore and Ohio Railroad, reporting marks B&O, and BO
 , Royal Navy sloop-of-war
 Martin Baltimore (A-30), attack/bomber aircraft
 USCS Baltimore, a United States Coast Survey schooner in service from 1851 to 1858
 USS Baltimore, several United States Navy ships

Other uses
 Baltimore classification, system used to classify viruses, named for biologist David Baltimore
 Baltimore Technologies, a former "dot-com darling" information security firm, now defunct

See also
 
 
 Baltimora (disambiguation)
 Lord Baltimore (disambiguation)
 New Baltimore (disambiguation)